Chinese Taipei participated in the 2010 Asian Beach Games in Muscat, Oman on 8–16 December 2010.

Athletes

Nations at the 2010 Asian Beach Games
2010
Asian Beach Games